Murgia may refer to:

Geography
Altopiano delle Murge, a plateau in Apulia, Italy
Alta Murgia National Park, Italy
Murgia, Álava, a village in Basque Country, Spain

People
Alessandro Murgia, Italian footballer
Alessio Murgia, Italian footballer
David Murgia, Belgian actor
Michela Murgia, Italian novelist
Nicole Murgia, Italian actress
Tiberio Murgia, Italian actor

Other
Murgia motion

Surnames of Italian origin